Please see Canada Post stamp releases (2000-2004) for any stamps produced between 2000-2004.
Please see Canada Post stamp releases (2005-2009) for any stamps produced between 2005-2009.

2010

2011
This is an incomplete list

Annual stamp poll
The annual poll is conducted in conjunction with Canada Stamp News.

2010 results
Favorite Canadian 2010 stamp issues

Most relevant Canadian 2010 stamp issues

Least Favorite Canadian 2010 stamp issues

Least Relevant Canadian 2010 stamp issues

Commemorative envelopes

Cancels

Choosing Canada's stamps
Although Canada Post is responsible for stamp design and production, the corporation does not actually choose the subjects or the final designs that appear on stamps. That task falls under the jurisprudence of the Stamp Advisory Committee. Their objective is to recommend a balanced stamp program that will have broad-based appeal, regionally and culturally, reflecting Canadian history, heritage, and tradition.

Before Canada Post calls a meeting of the committee, it also welcomes suggestions for stamp subjects from Canadian citizens. Ideas for subjects that have recently appeared on a stamp are declined. The committee works two years in advance and can approve approximately 20 subjects for each year.

Once a stamp subject is selected, Canada Post's Stamp Products group conducts research. Designs are commissioned from two firms, both chosen for their expertise. The designs are presented anonymously to the committee. The committee's process and selection policy have changed little in the thirty years since it was introduced.

Any ideas for a stamp should be sent to: Chairperson of the Stamp Advisory Committee, Canada Post, 2701 Riverside Drive Suite N1070, Ottawa, ON, K1A 0B1.

References

Postage stamps of Canada
Lists of postage stamps